Motion to Rejoin is the third full-length album by Brightblack Morning Light.  It was released on September 23, 2008 by Matador Records.

Track listing 
 "Introduction" – 0:42
 "Hologram Buffalo" – 5:18
 "Gathered Years" – 8:00
 "Oppressions Each" – 3:26
 "Another Reclamation" – 7:05
 "A Rainbow Aims" – 9:46
 "Summer Hoof" – 5:27
 "Past a Weatherbeaten Fencepost" – 6:49
 "When Beads Spell Power Leaf" – 2:43

References 

2008 albums
Brightblack Morning Light albums
Matador Records albums